Genesta M. Strong (November 29, 1885 – June 29, 1972) was an American politician from New York.

Life
She was born Genesta Mitchell on November 29, 1885, in Brooklyn. On September 12, 1906, she married Ernest Melvin Strong (1881–1961), and their only child was Genesta Mitchell (Strong) Raymond (1910–1982). She entered politics as a Republican.

She was a member of the New York State Assembly (Nassau Co., 3rd D.) from 1945 to 1959, sitting in the 165th, 166th, 167th, 168th, 169th, 170th, 171st and 172nd New York State Legislatures.

On November 3, 1959, she was elected to the New York State Senate (3rd D.), to fill the vacancy caused by the resignation of William S. Hults, Jr. She didn't take her seat, and resigned on January 6, 1960, because of ill health.

She died on June 29, 1972, in Plandome Heights, New York.

Sources

1885 births
1972 deaths
People from North Hempstead, New York
Republican Party members of the New York State Assembly
Women state legislators in New York (state)
Politicians from Nassau County, New York
People from Brooklyn
20th-century American politicians
20th-century American women politicians